Arsago Seprio is a town and comune located in the province of Varese, in the Lombardy region of northern Italy.

Famous for relevant archaeological remains of a Longobard necropolis as well a Romanic church and baptistery from the 9th and 10th century AD. Arsago is also known in the international sporting world as the site of World motocross championships which have been taking place since the mid nineteen eighties.

References

Cities and towns in Lombardy